Frank Cox may refer to:

Frank Cox (architect) (1854–1940), American artist and theatre architect 
Frank Cox (baseball) (1857–1928), played in 1884 Detroit Wolverines season
Frank Cox (businessman) (fl. c. 1900), leader of several coal companies
Frank Cox (director) (born 1940), British film director
Frank Cox (musician), played with Heart and the Lovemongers
Frank Cox (judge) (1862–1940), justice of the Supreme Court of Appeals of West Virginia
Frank Woodard Cox, superintendent of Virginia Beach City Public Schools, 1933–1968
Frank Cox of The Cox Twins (1920–2007)

See also
Elbert Frank Cox (1895–1969), American mathematician
Francis Cox (disambiguation)
Franklin Cox (born 1961), American composer and instrumentalist
, US Army ferry servicing San Francisco Bay area 1922–1947